Sideritis hyssopifolia, hyssop-leaved mountain ironwort. A 40 cm high shrublet with narrow pointed leaves. The flowers (1 cm) are borne in dense cylindrical clusters from broad spiny-toothed bracts. The calyx also has spiny teeth. Flowers June–August. Its IUCN Red List Category is least risk. 

The Latin word hyssopifolia (which also occurs in several other plant names, including that of Cuphea hyssopifolia) means "hyssop-leaved".

Distribution 
Mountains of Southwestern Europe at 1500–1800 m altitude.

Gallery

References

 The Flowers of Britain and Europe, Oleg Polunin, Oxford Paperbacks, Oxford University Press 1987,

External links
 http://encyclopaedia.alpinegardensociety.net/plants/Sideritis/hyssopifolia
 http://www.tandfonline.com/doi/abs/10.1080/10412905.1990.9697848#.UuwUDrQuMjU
 http://www.theplantlist.org/tpl/record/kew-191333
 http://www.tela-botanica.org/bdtfx-nn-63820
 http://bps.conference-services.net/resources/344/3046/pdf/EPHAR2012_0619.pdf
 http://www.kerneliv.dk/da/ovrige/1014-sideritis-hyssopifolia-touch-of-spice-.html

hyssopifolia
Flora of France
Flora of Spain
Plants described in 1753
Taxa named by Carl Linnaeus